Edwin Eustace Bryant (January 10, 1835August 11, 1903) was an American lawyer, Republican politician, and Union Army officer.  He was dean of the University of Wisconsin Law School, served as a private secretary to Wisconsin Governor Lucius Fairchild, and was appointed an assistant attorney general for the United States Postal Service by President Grover Cleveland.

Early life

Edwin Bryant was born in Milton, Vermont, in 1835.  He received an academic education and attended the New Hampton Institute for two years.  In 1856 he moved to Buffalo, New York, and, the following year, moved to Janesville, Wisconsin, where he was admitted to the State Bar of Wisconsin.  Shortly thereafter, he moved to Monroe, Wisconsin, where he practiced law and became part-owner and editor of the Monroe Sentinel.

Civil War service

At the outbreak of the American Civil War, Bryant volunteered for service with a Wisconsin militia company and was enrolled in the 3rd Wisconsin Infantry Regiment.  He declined an officer's commission, but at the organization of the regiment, he was appointed sergeant major.  Within a year, he received a commission anyway and was appointed adjutant to the regiment's colonel, Thomas H. Ruger.  With the 3rd Wisconsin Infantry, Bryant participated in many of the significant battles of the eastern theater of the war, including Antietam, Chancellorsville, and Gettysburg.  In August 1863, he was with the brigade sent to quell the New York City draft riots.

In the fall of 1863, he returned to Wisconsin as commissioner of the draft board and served in that capacity for a year.  In the spring of 1865, he was commissioned lieutenant colonel of the 50th Wisconsin Infantry Regiment and returned to federal service.  After re-entering federal service, Colonel Bryant was detailed from his regiment to a military commission—he worked as a judge advocate in Missouri for the next year.

Postbellum career

Bryant resigned from military service in 1866 and returned to Monroe, Wisconsin, where he resumed his law practice and became president of the board of directors of Monroe public schools.  In 1868, however, he was called to Madison, Wisconsin, to serve as adjutant general of the Wisconsin National Guard and private secretary to Governor Lucius Fairchild.  In Madison, Bryant became closely associated with John Coit Spooner and William Freeman Vilas, both of whom later went on to become United States senators.  After the end of the Fairchild administration in 1872, Bryant and Vilas were appointed by the Wisconsin Supreme Court to revise and annotate 18 volumes of the Wisconsin reports (Supreme Court decisions).  At the same time, Bryant and Vilas entered into a law partnership which would continue for the next decade.

In 1874, Bryant was the Republican nominee for district attorney of Dane County, but was defeated by the Democratic incumbent, Burr W. Jones.  In May 1876, Bryant was re-appointed adjutant general of Wisconsin by Governor Harrison Ludington, and was retained in that office by Ludington's successor, William E. Smith.  While serving as adjutant general, in 1877, Bryant was elected to one term in the Wisconsin State Assembly from Dane County's 2nd Assembly district (at the time this district comprised the city of Madison and southeast Dane County).

After his term as adjutant general expired in 1882, he was appointed chief clerk of the U.S. House Committee on Public Lands, under the chairmanship of Wisconsin congressman Thaddeus C. Pound, and moved to Washington, D.C.  A year later, however, Bryant returned to Madison, purchased a one-third stake in the ownership of the Madison Democrat, and converted his political affiliation to the Democratic Party.

In the 1884 United States presidential election, Bryant campaigned extensively for Grover Cleveland.  After his election, Cleveland appointed Bryant assistant attorney general for the United States Postal Service.  His longtime friend and colleague, William F. Vilas, was appointed U.S. Postmaster General.  He ultimately served in that role for the entire Cleveland administration.

In 1889, Bryant returned to Madison and was appointed dean of the University of Wisconsin Law School, where he served until his death in 1903. Bryant also served as chairman of the Fish Commission of Wisconsin. He also wrote about national law and Wisconsin.

He died on a train near Toronto while traveling to visit his birthplace in Vermont.

Published works

Electoral history

Dane County District Attorney (1874)

| colspan="6" style="text-align:center;background-color: #e9e9e9;"| General Election, November 3, 1874

Wisconsin Assembly (1877)

| colspan="6" style="text-align:center;background-color: #e9e9e9;"| General Election, November 6, 1877

References

External links
 

1835 births
1903 deaths
People from Milton, Vermont
Politicians from Janesville, Wisconsin
People from Monroe, Wisconsin
Lawyers from Madison, Wisconsin
Writers from Madison, Wisconsin
Politicians from Madison, Wisconsin
Writers from Vermont
Wisconsin lawyers
Wisconsin Democrats
Wisconsin Republicans
Editors of Wisconsin newspapers
People of Wisconsin in the American Civil War
United States Assistant Attorneys General
University of Wisconsin Law School faculty
Members of the Wisconsin State Assembly
19th-century American politicians
Adjutants General of Wisconsin